Concepción González Molina (born 6 August 1953) is a Mexican politician from the Institutional Revolutionary Party. From 2000 to 2003 she served as the Deputy of the LVIII Legislature of the Mexican Congress representing Puebla.

References

1953 births
Living people
Politicians from Puebla
Women members of the Chamber of Deputies (Mexico)
Institutional Revolutionary Party politicians
21st-century Mexican politicians
21st-century Mexican women politicians
Deputies of the LVIII Legislature of Mexico
Members of the Chamber of Deputies (Mexico) for Puebla